Qadi al-Aqib ibn Mahmud ibn Umar ibn Muhammad Aqit (1507/15081583) was a Sanhaja Berber qadi (supreme Judge) of Timbuktu and Imam of Sankore mosque.

Life 
al-Aqib ibn Mahmud was born in 1507/1508 to the Sanhaja Berber Aqit family. He studied under his father and uncle, then went to make the hajj, where he studied under leading scholars like al-Nasir al-Laqani, who certified him to teach a number of books. Ahmad Baba, who was his cousin once removed, studied under him, and got an ijaza. In 1565, al-Aqib succeeded his brother, Qāḍī Muḥammad, as the Qadi of Timbuktu.

In 1569, he began rebuilding Sidi Yahya Mosque, and in 1570 renovating Djinguereber Mosque, followed by the sūq mosque in 1577/1578. He rebuilt the Sankore mosque the following year, for which he precisely adopted the Qibla.

He died on 10 August 1583 and was succeeded as Qadi by his brother Abu Hafs Umar.

See also 
 Sankore Madrasah
 Djinguereber Mosque
 Mali Empire

Notes

References 

1507 births
1583 deaths
16th-century Berber people
Malian scholars
Malian imams
Malian judges
People from Timbuktu
Massufa